Tsagaandorjiin Gündegmaa (born 6 February 1946) is a Mongolian gymnast. She competed at the 1964 Summer Olympics and the 1968 Summer Olympics.

References

1946 births
Living people
Mongolian female artistic gymnasts
Olympic gymnasts of Mongolia
Gymnasts at the 1964 Summer Olympics
Gymnasts at the 1968 Summer Olympics
People from Övörkhangai Province
20th-century Mongolian women